BASR may refer to:
Bureau of Applied Social Research, American social research institute
British Association for the Study of Religions
Bateshwar Halt railway station, station code "BASR"

See also